Saddle Island is a settlement in Newfoundland and Labrador.

Saddle Island is part of the Red Bay UNESCO site, a 16th-century Basque whaling station.  On the island are the locations of a number of former tryworks sites and of cooperages.  In two places, there are broken ceramic roofing tiles indicating the locations of Basque buildings.  There is also a cemetery from which samples of clothing were obtained so that reconstructions can be displayed in the museum on the mainland.

Populated places in Labrador